SNoW (pronounced: "Snow"; born June 11, 1985 in Tokyo, Japan) is a Japanese singer and songwriter also known as Yukie.

Biography
She grew up in a bilingual environment. Her favorite artists include Ani DiFranco, Iggy Pop, Talking Heads, and Tracy Chapman.

Her debut single "Yes" was released under an indie record label in November 2004. In 2005, she switched labels to Sony Music Entertainment Japan and released Hanabi made Ato Sukoshi (花火まであとすこし - unofficial translation: "Until the Fireworks") in July.

Her third single, Sakasama no Chō (逆さまの蝶 - unofficial translation: "Resting Butterfly"), was released on January 25, 2006. Sakasama no Chō was the opening theme of the 2005/2006 anime Jigoku Shoujo A.K.A. "Hell Girl" (地獄少女), selling over 50,000 copies. The song was also the theme and inspiration of movie Humoresque ~Sakasama no Chō~ (2006), and featured within episode 6 of the 2006/2007 anime Jigoku Shoujo Futakomori.

The opening theme for Jigoku Shōjo's second season, NightmaRe, was also performed and co-written by SNoW, and was released as a single on December 6, 2006.

Her contract with Sony Music ended in July 2007. According to her official blog, she stated that the strain from both her professional and personal life was taking its toll. As a result, she decided to take a break from her music.

In 2008 and 2009, she collaborated with SoulJa under the name Yukie for the songs  and "Colorz of Love", "DaBounce".

In 2009, she joined Kazuya Yoshii's (from the Yellow Monkeys) tour as a backing vocalist.

In 2015, she recorded 2 songs on YUKI JOLLY ROGER's first album as a producer, “The Logbook I.”

In 2017, March 27, SNoW released 3 songs, the beginning of her music career again as a singer & songwriter.

"Sorry for the 10 year wait!", she says in SNoW's new official website.

Discography

Singles
Yes - November 25, 2004
 - July 6, 2005
 - January 25, 2006
 Opening theme song for Jigoku Shōjo, as well as the main theme song for Humoresque: Sakasama no Chō
NightmaRe - July 5, 2006
 Opening theme song for Jigoku Shōjo Futakomori
on&on - December 6, 2006
Yami Wo Nukete - March 27, 2017
Rest In Peace - July 6, 2020

Albums
  - January 24, 2007

References

External links 
SNoW Official Website

1985 births
Living people
Sony Music Entertainment Japan artists
Singers from Tokyo
21st-century Japanese singers
21st-century Japanese women singers